The 3rd National Film Awards, then known as State Awards for Films, presented by Ministry of Information and Broadcasting, India to felicitate the best of Indian Cinema released in the year 1955. Ceremony took place at Vigyan Bhavan, New Delhi on September 1956 and awards were given by Prime Minister of India, Jawaharlal Nehru.

Juries 

Three different committees were formed based on the film making sectors in India, mainly based in Bombay, Calcutta and Madras. Another committee for all India level was also formed which included some of the members from regional committee. For 3rd National Film Awards, central committee was headed by C. D. Deshmukh.

 Jury Members: Central
 C. D. Deshmukh (Chairperson)M. D. BhatN. K. SiddhantaW. S. Krishnaswami NayuduAmmu SwaminathanSucheta KriplaniRamdhari Singh DinkarSyed NurullahArdhendu MukerjeeD. RamanujamSudhir Mukerjee
 Jury Regional: Bombay
 M. D. Bhat (Chairperson)Pandit Narendra SharmaP. N. AroraJayant DesaiM. R. PalandeJagdish Sethi
 Jury Regional: Calcutta
 N. K. Siddhanta (Chairperson)Sabita DeviS. K. MukerjeeTarasankar BandyopadhyayKalidas NagSudhir Mukerjee
 Jury Regional: Madras
 W. S. Krishnaswami Nayudu (Chairperson)ManjubhashiniMu. VaradarajanR. SubbaraoA. RamaiahA. AiyapanV. K. GokakS. M. Naidu

Awards 

Awards were divided into feature films and non-feature films.

President's Gold Medal for the All India Best Feature Film is now better known as National Film Award for Best Feature Film, whereas President's Gold Medal for the Best Documentary Film is analogous to today's National Film Award for Best Non-Feature Film. For children's films, Prime Minister's Gold Medal is now given as National Film Award for Best Children's Film. At the regional level, President's Silver Medal for Best Feature Film is now given as National Film Award for Best Feature Film in a particular language. Certificate of Merit in all the categories is discontinued over the years.

Feature films 

Feature films were awarded at All India as well as regional level. For 3rd National Film Awards, Pather Panchali, a Bengali film by a debutant director Satyajit Ray won the President's Gold Medal for the All India Best Feature Film. Following were the awards given:

All India Award 

For 3rd National Film Awards, none of the films were awarded from Children's films category as no film was found to be suitable.

Regional Award 

With 3rd National Film Awards, new award category was introduced for the feature films made in Assamese language. This newly introduced category includes President's Silver Medal for Best Feature Film in Assamese and Certificate of Merit for second and third best film, although former was not given as no film was found suitable for the award.

The awards were given to the best films made in the regional languages of India. For 3rd National Film Awards, President's Silver Medal for Best Feature Film was not given in Assamese, Bengali, Hindi, Kannada and Tamil language; instead Certificate of Merit was awarded in each particular language.

Non-Feature films 

Non-feature film awards were given for the documentaries made in the country. Following were the awards given:

Documentaries

Awards not given 

Following were the awards not given as no film was found to be suitable for the award:

 Prime Minister's Gold Medal for the Best Children's Film
 President's Silver Medal for Best Feature Film in Assamese
 President's Silver Medal for Best Feature Film in Bengali
 President's Silver Medal for Best Feature Film in Hindi
 President's Silver Medal for Best Feature Film in Kannada
 President's Silver Medal for Best Feature Film in Malayalam
 President's Silver Medal for Best Feature Film in Tamil

References

External links 
 National Film Awards Archives
 Official Page for Directorate of Film Festivals, India

National Film Awards (India) ceremonies
1956 in Indian cinema
1956 film awards